The longest managerial reign in association football belongs to Englishman Fred Everiss, who was manager of Football League team West Bromwich Albion for over 45 years, starting his reign in 1902 and ending when he retired in 1948. The longest post-war reign belongs to Frenchman Guy Roux, who managed Auxerre in three separate reigns totalling 44 years, taking them from France's fifth division to become Division 1 champions in 1995.

Managerial reigns in football have decreased since the 1960s, and by 2015, the average spell in England's top four divisions was 1.23 years. Managers such as Pep Guardiola and Béla Guttmann have been proponents of a "three-year rule", as has football journalist and author Jonathan Wilson, who writes that managers can succumb to a "fatalistic idealism" beyond this period, describing it as similar to a Greek tragedy.

Longest reigns
In the early decades of organised football, team selection was often conducted by committee among the club directors, with an appointed 'secretary-manager' dealing with player contracts and other administrative tasks, assisted by 'trainers' dealing with coaching and fitness matters. As the secretary role was largely clerical and often occupied by one of the directors, they tended to remain in post for many years regardless of results in the short term. Until after World War I, some clubs never had a manager by name.

As demands and expectations on officials increased both on and off the field, gradually specialist roles became commonplace, and by the end of the 1930s, it was common for clubs in the British Isles to have an official manager as a figurehead dealing with most or all team matters, but with less long-term job security than the secretary-managers of old. Elsewhere, the separation between the office and pitchside functions persisted: the head coach in charge of training and match tactics became increasingly respected and prominent, but meanwhile while a figure closer to the ownership in the role of general manager, sporting director or director of football maintained control over financial and commercial aspects, with the levels of influence and balance of power between the coach and director varying between clubs and nations. As in the earlier era, the director would often have a tenure of several years to oversee the overall progress of the club, whilst the head coach would typically keep their job only for as long as the on-field results were positive.

For the purpose of this list, a separation has been made between pre-World War II reigns, which includes many secretary-managers, and the period after the conflict ended when regular competitions resumed in most countries, and longer managerial/head coach appointments became far less commonplace. For those whose terms spanned World War II, they have been placed in the section covering the majority of their reign. Long serving head coaches in international football are also recorded separately below.

Clubs

Pre-1946

Post-1946

National teams

See also
 List of football managers with most games

References

Association football records and statistics
Lists of association football managers